Saint Joseph is a New Testament figure, the husband of Mary and legal father of Jesus.

Saint Joseph may also refer to:

In religion
Saint Joseph of Arimathea
Saint Joseph Marello
Saint Joseph of Leonessa
Saint Joseph of Cupertino
Saint Joseph the Hymnographer
Saint Joseph Calasanctius 
Saint Joseph Cafasso
Saint Joseph Cottolengo
Saint Joseph the Hesychast
Joseph, a priest martyred with Abda and Abdjesus
 Jose Maria Diaz Sanjuro, Joseph Canh Luang Hoang, Joseph Fernandez, Joseph Hien Quang Do, Joseph Khang Duy Nguyen, Joseph Luu Van Nguyen, Joseph Marchand, Joseph Nghi Kim, Joseph Thi Dang Le, Joseph Uyen Dinh Nguyen, Joseph Vien Dinh Dang, Joseph Khang, Joseph Tuc and Joseph Tuan Van Tran of the Vietnamese Martyrs
 Saint Joseph Vaz
Joseph (patriarch), son of Jacob, not given the title saint, but a major figure in the Hebrew Bible and traditionally considered a saint along with other biblical patriarchs

Geography

Places

Canada
 Saint-Joseph, New Brunswick, an unincorporated community in Kent County
 Saint-Joseph Parish, New Brunswick, in Madawaska County
 Saint-Joseph-de-Madawaska, New Brunswick, an unincorporated community therein
 St. Joseph, Antigonish, Nova Scotia in Antigonish County
 St. Joseph, Digby, Nova Scotia in Digby County
St. Joseph Island (Ontario)
St. Joseph, Ontario
Fort St. Joseph (Ontario), former British outpost on St. Joseph Island
Saint-Joseph, Quebec (disambiguation), several places
St. Joseph's, Saskatchewan hamlet in south east Saskatchewan
St. Joseph's Colony, Saskatchewan in west central Saskatchewan

France
 Saint-Joseph, Loire
 Saint-Joseph, Manche
 Saint-Joseph, Martinique
 Saint-Joseph, Réunion
 Saint-Joseph-de-Rivière, in the Isère département
 Saint-Joseph-des-Bancs, in the Ardèche département
 Saint-Joseph AOC, an Appellation d'Origine Contrôlée in the Rhône wine region
École Saint-Joseph, Solesmes

United States
St. Joseph, Florida (disambiguation)
St. Joseph, Illinois
Saint Joseph, Floyd County, Indiana
Saint Joseph, Vanderburgh County, Indiana
St. Joseph, Iowa
St. Joseph, Kansas
St. Joseph, Louisville, Kentucky
St. Joseph, Louisiana
St. Joseph, Michigan
St. Joseph, Minnesota
St. Joseph, Missouri
Saint Joseph, Mercer County, Ohio
Saint Joseph, Portage County, Ohio
Saint Joseph, Oregon
Saint Joseph, Tennessee
St. Jo, Texas
Saint Joseph, Marshall County, West Virginia
St. Joseph, Wisconsin

Caribbean
Saint Joseph (Trinidad and Tobago)
The Parish of Saint Joseph, Barbados
Saint Joseph Parish, Dominica
Saint-Joseph, Martinique, a commune in Martinique

Rivers
In the United States:
St. Joseph River (Lake Michigan) in southwest Michigan and northwest Indiana
St. Joseph River (Maumee River) in south central Michigan and northeast Indiana

Islands
St. Joseph Island (Ontario), a Canadian island in Lake Huron
Île Saint-Joseph, the southernmost island of the three Îles du Salut in the Atlantic Ocean off the coast of French Guiana
San José Island (Texas), a barrier island on the Texas coast in the United States, also known as "St. Joseph Island"
Saint Joseph Island (Seychelles), main island of St. Joseph Atoll, Seychelles

Landmarks

In Canada
Saint Joseph's Oratory, a Catholic basilica in Montréal, Québec

In the United States
Cathedral Basilica of St. Joseph (San Jose), California
St. Joseph Catholic Church, Detroit, Michigan, a historic parish
St. Joseph's Catholic Church, a parish located adjacent to the United States Capitol Building in Washington, D.C.
St. Joseph Medical Center (disambiguation)
National Shrine of Saint Joseph (disambiguation)
Mount Saint Joseph College, a Baltimore Catholic high school
 Saint Joseph Abbey, St. Tammany Parish, Louisiana, listed on the NRHP in Louisiana
Saint Joseph's University, a Jesuit university in Philadelphia, Pennsylvania

In Turkey
St. Joseph High School (Istanbul), a French private school in Turkey

Other place names
In the United States:
St. Joseph Bay, a bay on the Gulf Coast of Florida
St. Joseph Peninsula, a peninsula or spit on the Gulf Coast of Florida
St. Joseph Point, the end of the St. Joseph Peninsula in Florida
St. Joseph Sound, a bay in Pasco and Pinellas counties, Florida
St. Joseph Valley Parkway, carrying parts of U.S. Routes 20 and 31

Business
St. Joseph, a brand of aspirin

Biology
Saint Joseph noir, another name for the Italian wine grape San Giuseppe nero

Sports
St. Joseph F.C., an association football club based in Nakuru, Kenya

See also
List of churches named after Saint Joseph
Islamic view of Joseph
Saint Joseph's (disambiguation)
Saint Joseph's College (disambiguation)
St. Joseph County (disambiguation)
St. Joseph Seminary (disambiguation)
St. Joseph Township (disambiguation)
St. Joe (disambiguation)
San José (disambiguation)
San Giuseppe (disambiguation)